Klooster (Dutch for "monastery, cloister, convent") may refer to

Locations in the Netherlands
 't Klooster, a neighborhood in Gelderland
 Klooster (Drenthe), a village
 Klooster (North Brabant), a hamlet
 Klooster-Lidlum, a village in Friesland

People
 Klooster (surname)